St. John of God Catholic Hospital, also known as Mabessaneh Hospital, is a hospital located in Mabesseneh, Lunsar, Sierra Leone.  It is run by the Brothers Hospitallers of St. John of God, an international Catholic organisation.

It is a non-denominational hospital with several departments, some of which are a common part of Healthcare in Sierra Leone, such as the Outpatients, Paediatrics, Medical and Maternity, others such as Emergency, Surgery, Pharmacy and Microbiology are not especially in the provinces, outside the capital.

It has several links to European organisations. It is the only Sierra Leonean hospital outside of the capital Freetown which has a microbiological department run by the German NGO GLOBOLAB e.V. and is twinned with Hospital Sant Joan de Déu Barcelona.

See also
2014 Ebola virus epidemic in Sierra Leone

References

External links
 St. John of God Brothers Website
 Apadrina's sponsor a child system for the hospital

Hospital buildings completed in 1964
Catholic hospitals in Africa
Hospitals in Sierra Leone
Hospitals established in 1964